In Old English poetry, many descriptive epithets for God were used to satisfy alliterative requirements.  These epithets include:

List

See also
 Name of God in Christianity
Wuldor
List of kennings
List of names of Odin
List of names of Freyr

Notes

References 

Swanton, Michael James, The Dream of the Rood. 
Godden, Malcolm, Michael Lapidge. The Cambridge companion to Old English literature. 2002. University of Cambridge Press. 

Christianity in Anglo-Saxon England
Old English poetry
English